Henry Herrick, sometimes spelled Henry Hayrick or Henry Heyrick or Henry Heyricke was a member of the Virginia House of Burgesses, the elected lower house of the colonial Virginia General Assembly, from Warwick County, in 1644 and 1644–1645.

In a note in the Richmond Standard quoted in other sources, Henry Herrick is said to be a nephew of Thomas Herrick, burgess for "The Upper Part of" Elizabeth City, Virginia, later Elizabeth City County, Virginia, now Hampton, Virginia, in 1629–1630.

He was the son of William Herrick (MP) and his wife, Joan, daughter of Richard May of London and his wife, Mary Hilderson of Devonshire.

Notes

References

 Stanard, William G. and Mary Newton Stanard. The Virginia Colonial Register. Albany, NY: Joel Munsell's Sons Publishers, 1902. , Retrieved July 15, 2011.
 Tyler, Lyon Gardiner, ed. 'Encyclopedia of Virginia Biography'. Volume 1. New York, Lewis Historical Publishing Company, 1915. . Retrieved February 16, 2013.

People from Warwick County, Virginia
Virginia colonial people
House of Burgesses members
17th-century American politicians
1604 births
1671 deaths